Ober-Mörlen is a municipality in the Wetteraukreis, in Hesse, Germany. It is located approximately 29 kilometers north of Frankfurt am Main.

References 

Wetteraukreis